The Church of San Salvador (Basque: San Salbador Eliza, Spanish: Iglesia de San Salvador) is a church located in Getaria, Gipuzkoa. It was declared Bien de Interés Cultural in 1895.

References

See also 
 List of Bienes de Interés Cultural in the Province of Gipuzkoa

Bien de Interés Cultural landmarks in Gipuzkoa
Churches in the Basque Country (autonomous community)